Josua Antonio Mejías García (born 9 June 1997) is a Venezuelan footballer who plays as a central defender for Israeli club Beitar Jerusalem.

International career
Mejías was called up to the Venezuela under-20 side for the 2017 FIFA U-20 World Cup.

He made his debut for the Venezuela national football team on 7 October 2021 in a World Cup qualifier against Brazil.

Career statistics

Club

Honours

International
Venezuela U-20
FIFA U-20 World Cup: Runner-up 2017
South American Youth Football Championship: Third Place 2017

References

External links
 
 

1997 births
Living people
Venezuelan footballers
Association football defenders
CD Leganés players
FC Cartagena footballers
Gimnàstic de Tarragona footballers
Atlético Madrid B players
Málaga CF players
Beitar Jerusalem F.C. players
Venezuelan Primera División players
Carabobo F.C. players
Segunda División players
Segunda División B players
Israeli Premier League players
Venezuela international footballers
Venezuelan expatriate footballers
Expatriate footballers in Spain
Expatriate footballers in Israel
Venezuelan expatriate sportspeople in Spain
Venezuelan expatriate sportspeople in Israel
Sportspeople from Valencia, Venezuela